The PEN/Hemingway Award is awarded annually to a full-length novel or book of short stories by an American author who has not previously published a full-length book of fiction.  The award is named after Ernest Hemingway and funded by the Hemingway family and the Ernest Hemingway Foundation/Society. It is administered by PEN America. Mary Hemingway, a member of PEN, founded the award in 1976 both to honor the memory of her husband and to recognize distinguished first books of fiction.

The winner is selected by a panel of three distinguished fiction writers and receives a cash prize of US$25,000. Along with the winner, two finalists and two runners-up receive a Ucross Residency Fellowship at the Ucross Foundation, a retreat for artists and writers on a 22,000 acre (89 km²) ranch on the high plains in Ucross, Wyoming.  The award ceremony is held at the John F. Kennedy Presidential Library and Museum in Boston, Massachusetts.

The award presentation is sponsored in part by the JFK Presidential Library.

The award is one of many PEN awards sponsored by International PEN affiliates in over 145 PEN centres around the world.

Winners

Notes

External links
Hemingway Foundation: PEN/Hemingway Award homepage
PEN America: PEN/Hemingway Award homepage

PEN New England awards
Awards established in 1976
1976 establishments in the United States
American fiction awards
Short story awards
First book awards
Ernest Hemingway